Stomatella gattegnoi is a species of sea snail, a marine gastropod mollusk in the family Trochidae, the top snails.

Description
The size of the shell varies between 4 mm and 16 mm.

Distribution
This marine species occurs off the Philippines at Mactan island at depths between 20 m and 100 m.

References

External links
 

gattegnoi
Gastropods described in 2006